Cross Sound Ferry is a passenger and road vehicle ferry service operating between New London, Connecticut and Orient on the North Fork of Long Island, New York.

The service is privately owned and operated by Cross Sound Ferry Services,  headquartered in New London and run by the Wronowski family, which also owns and operates the Block Island Express ferry service and the Thames Shipyard and Repair Company.

Overview
Though there have been multiple proposals to bridge the Long Island Sound at various locations, none have ever come to fruition. Therefore, Long Island motorists located east of the Throgs Neck Bridge heading toward Connecticut must first drive west into Queens, cross one of the three city bridges to the Bronx, and then drive east to reach New England destinations. In addition to the saving in mileage, use of Cross Sound Ferry or its western competitor, the Bridgeport & Port Jefferson Ferry, drivers avoids heavy urban traffic in New York City and on Interstate 95 in Connecticut.

The ferry serves over one million passengers annually, about half of whom live on Long Island.

Cross Sound Ferry previously attempted to establish service between New London and East Hampton, on the South Fork of Long Island. A local ordinance passed by the Town of East Hampton in 1997 prohibits vehicle ferry service within the Town's borders and places limits on the speeds of both passenger vessels and road vehicles. Cross Sound Ferry filed a lawsuit against the town in 2004 to overturn the ruling, which was eventually dismissed.

Cross Sound Ferry operates year-round with up to 32 daily departures with the lone exception of no service on December 25, Christmas Day.

Sister companies
The Block Island Express, a high-speed passenger ferry service, operates out of the same New London ferry terminal and services Block Island (New Shoreham, Rhode Island). The Thames Shipyard and Repair Company services both Cross Sound Ferry and Block Island Express vessels. All three organizations share the 2 Ferry Street office at the New London terminal.

The three companies, as well as the Thames Towboat Company, are owned by John P. Wronowski and son, Adam Wronowski.

Fleet
Cross Sound Ferry Services owns a fleet of seven traditional vehicle-passenger ferries, one high-speed passenger-only ferry, and two additional ferries cruises and charters. Vessels are retrofitted at Cross Sound's sister company, Thames Shipyard and Repair. Block Island Ferry Services has one vessel, serviced at the same shipyard.

Controversy
Local officials on Long Island's North Fork have criticized Cross Sound Ferry for causing increased vehicle traffic on New York State Route 25 (NY 25), particularly following the addition of its Sea Jet service. The Orient terminal is located at the eastern terminus of NY 25, and all traffic must use NY 25 to get to and from the ferry terminal; travelers coming from points further west must travel through several towns, including Riverhead and Southold in the process. In an attempt to verify this, the Town of Southold commissioned a corridor study in 2007. However, the results of the study found that "the section of [NY 25] in the vicinity of the Cross Sound Ferry currently operates with a Vehicle to Capacity (v/c) ratio of .18. This means that the roadway is currently running at 18% of its total capacity. This also means that the roadway can handle approximately five times the current traffic."

The town dropped its case after Cross Sound Ferry agreed to enforce parking restrictions along the shoulder of NY 25, and also made changes to the ferry company's zoning and site-plan.

On November 19, 2002, semi-truck driver Michael Zuber was killed by drowning after his semi-truck rolled off the back deck of the Susan Anne while he was asleep behind the wheel after crew members neglected to place wheel chocks behind the back wheels of Zuber's semi-truck. No criminal charges were filed against Cross Sound Ferry or any of its employees, but Zuber's family later filed a wrongful death lawsuit against the ferry company. The two sides agreed to an out-of-court settlement for $3.2 million in 2008, some six years after the accident.

References

External links

Cross Sound Ferry official website

Ferries of Connecticut
Ferries of New York (state)
Transportation in New London County, Connecticut
Transportation in Suffolk County, New York
Long Island Sound